Ghotki Tehsil is an administrative subdivision (tehsil) of Ghotki District in the Sindh province of Pakistan. It is administratively subdivided into ten Union Councils, two of which form the capital Ghotki.

See also
2019 Ghotki riots

References

Talukas of Sindh
Ghotki District